Bengali Muslims are adherents of Islam who ethnically, linguistically and genealogically identify as Bengalis. Comprising about two-thirds of the global Bengali population, they are the second-largest ethnic group among Muslims after Arabs. Bengali Muslims make up the majority of Bangladesh's citizens, and are the largest minority in the Indian states of West Bengal, Tripura and Assam.

They speak or identify the Bengali language as their mother tongue. The majority of Bengali Muslims are Sunnis who follow the Hanafi school of jurisprudence.

The Bengal region was a supreme power of the medieval Islamic East. European traders identified the Bengal Sultanate as "the richest country to trade with".  Bengal viceroy Muhammad Azam Shah assumed the imperial throne. Mughal Bengal became increasingly independent under the Nawabs of Bengal in the 18th century.

The Bengali Muslim population emerged as a synthesis of Islamic and Bengali cultures. After the Partition of India in 1947, they comprised the demographic majority of Pakistan until the independence of East Pakistan (historic East Bengal) as Bangladesh in 1971.

Identity
A Bengali is a person of ethnic and linguistic heritage from the Bengal region in South Asia speaking the Indo-Aryan Bengali language. Islam arrived in the first millennium and influenced the native Bengali culture. The influx of Persian, Turkic, Arab and Mughal settlers contributed further diversity to the cultural development of the region. The Muslim population in Bengal further rose with the agricultural and administrative reforms during the Mughal period, particularly in eastern Bengal. Today, most Bengali Muslims live in the modern country of Bangladesh, the world's fourth largest Muslim-majority country, along with the Indian states of West Bengal and Assam.

The majority of Bengali Muslims are Sunnis who follow the Hanafi school of jurisprudence. There are also minorities of Shias and Ahmadiyas, as well as people who identify as non-denominational (or "just a Muslim").

History

Pre-Islamic history
Rice-cultivating communities existed in Bengal since the second millennium BCE. The region was home to a large agriculturalist population, marginally influenced by Dharmic religions. Buddhism influenced the region in the first millennium. The Bengali language developed from Apabhramsa, Sanskrit, Magadhi Prakrit between the 7th and 10th centuries. It once formed a single Indo-Aryan branch with Assamese and Oriya, before the languages became distinct.

Early explorers
The spread of Islam in the Indian subcontinent can be a contested issue. Historical evidences suggest the early Muslim traders and merchants visited  Bengal  while traversing the Silk Road in the first millennium. One of the earliest mosques in South Asia is under excavation in northern Bangladesh, indicating the presence of Muslims in the area around the lifetime of the Prophet Muhammad. Starting in the 9th century, Muslim merchants increased trade with Bengali seaports. Islam first appeared in Bengal during Pala rule, as a result of increased trade between Bengal and the Arab Abbasid Caliphate. Coins of the Abbasid Caliphate have been discovered in many parts of the region. The people of Samatata, in southeastern Bengal, during the 10th-century were of various religious backgrounds. During this time, Arab geographer Al-Masudi, who authored The Meadows of Gold, travelled to the region and noticed a Muslim community of inhabitants.

In addition to trade, Islam was also being introduced to the people of Bengal through the migration of Sufi missionaries prior to conquest. The earliest known Sufi missionaries were Syed Shah Surkhul Antia and his students, most notably Shah Sultan Rumi, in the 11th century. Rumi settled in present-day Netrokona, Mymensingh where he influenced the local ruler and population to embrace Islam.

Early Islamic kingdoms

While Bengal was under the Hindu Sena Empire, subsequent Muslim conquests helped spread Islam throughout the region. Bakhtiyar Khalji, a Turkic Muslim general, defeated king Lakshman Sen in 1206 CE and annexed large parts of Bengal to the Delhi Sultanate. Khalji also mounted an Islamic invasion of Tibet. Following this initial conquest, an influx of missionaries arrived in Bengal and many Bengalis began to adopt Islam as their way of life. Sultan Balkhi and Shah Makhdum Rupos settled in the present-day Rajshahi Division in northern Bengal, preaching to the communities there. A community of 13 Muslim families headed by Burhanuddin also existed in the northeastern Hindu city of Srihatta (Sylhet), claiming their descendants to have arrived from Chittagong. By 1303, hundreds of Sufi preachers led by Shah Jalal aided the Muslim rulers in Bengal to conquer Sylhet, turning the town into Jalal's headquarters for religious activities. Following the conquest, Jalal disseminated his followers across different parts of Bengal to spread Islam, and became a household name among Bengali Muslims.

Sultanate of Bengal

 

The establishment of a single united Bengal Sultanate in 1352 by Shamsuddin Ilyas Shah finally gave rise to a "Bengali" socio-linguistic identity. The Ilyas Shahi dynasty acknowledged Muslim scholarship, and this transcended ethnic background. Usman Serajuddin, also known as Akhi Siraj Bengali, was a native of Gaur in western Bengal and became the Sultanate's court scholar during Ilyas Shah's reign. Alongside Persian and Arabic, the sovereign Sunni Muslim nation-state also enabled the language of the Bengali people to gain patronage and support, contrary to previous states which exclusively favoured Sanskrit, Pali and Persian. The converted Sultan Jalaluddin Muhammad Shah funded the construction of Islamic seminaries as far as Mecca and Madina in the Middle East. The people of Arabia came to know these institutions as al-Madaris al-Bangaliyyah (Bengali madrasas).

The Bengal Sultanate was a melting pot of Muslim political, mercantile and military elites. During the 14th century, Islamic kingdoms stretched from Muslim Spain in the west to Bengal in the east. Moroccan traveler Ibn Battuta's diary is one of the best known accounts of the prelude to the Bengal Sultanate. Ibn Battuta visited Bengal during the reign of Sultan Fakhruddin Mubarak Shah, a rebel governor of the Delhi Sultanate who established a city state in Sonargaon. At the time, Bengal was divided into the three city states of Sonargaon, Satgaon and Lakhnauti. In 1352, the three city states were united by Ilyas Shah into a single, unitary, independent Bengal Sultanate. The creation of the Bengal Sultanate sparked several Bengal-Delhi Wars, which resulted in Delhi recognizing Bengal's independence. The Ilyas Shahi dynasty consolidated Bengali statehood, the economy and diplomatic relations. A network of Mint Towns - provincial capitals which produced the Sultan's sovereign currency called the tanka - was established across Bengal. The Bengali state followed the Persian model of statecraft. Muslims from other parts of the world were imported for military, bureaucratic and household services. These immigrants included Turks from upper India who were originally recruited in Central Asia; as well as black Abyssinians imported via East Africa into the Bengali port of Chittagong. A highly commercialized and monetized economy evolved. Islamic architecture was introduced on a major scale. A huge mosque called the Adina Mosque was built following the design of the Great Mosque of Damascus. A distinct Bengali Muslim architectural style developed, with terracotta and stone buildings showing a fusion of Persian and Bengali elements. Mosques included two categories, including multi-domed rectangular structures and single-domed square structures. A distinct style of Bengali mihrabs, minbars, terracotta arabesque, and do-chala roofs developed; this influence also spread to other regions.

The Bengal Sultanate was ruled by five dynastic periods, with each period have a particular ethnic identity. The Ilyas Shahi dynasty was of Turkic origins. It was replaced by the Bengali-origin dynasty of Jalaluddin Muhammad Shah and Shamsuddin Ahmad Shah for a few decades before being restored. In the 1490s, a series of Abyssinian generals took turns in becoming the Sultan of Bengal. They were succeeded by the Hussain Shahi dynasty which claimed Arab descent. They were in turn replaced by the Pashtun rulers of the Suri dynasty, who first acted as regional governors before restoring Bengali independence. The last dynasty, the Karrani dynasty, was also of Pashtun origin. The sultanate period saw a flourishing of Islamic scholarship and the development of Bengali literature. Scholars, writers and poets of sultanate-era Bengal included Usman Serajuddin, Alaul Haq, Nur Qutb Alam, Alaol, Shah Muhammad Sagir, Abdul Hakim, Syed Sultan, Qadi Ruknu'd-Din Abu Hamid Muhammad bin Muhammad al-'Amidi, Abu Tawwama, Saiyid Ibrahim Danishmand, Saiyid Arif Billah Muhammad Kamel and Saiyid Muhammad Yusuf among others. Bengal's tradition of Persian prose was acknowledged by Hafez.  The Dobhashi tradition saw Bengali transliteration of Arabic and Persian words in Bengali texts to illustrate Islamic epics and stories.

During the independent sultanate period, Bengal forged strong diplomatic relations with empires outside the subcontinent. The most notable of these relationships was with Ming China and its emperor Yongle. At least a dozen embassies were exchanged between China and Bengal. The Sultan of Bengal even gifted an East African giraffe to the Emperor of China as a tribute to China-Bengal relations. The Chinese Muslim admiral Zheng He visited Bengal as an envoy of the Emperor of China. Bengali ships transported the embassies of Sumatra, Brunei and Malacca to the port of Canton. China and the Timurid ruler of Herat mediated an end to the Bengal Sultanate-Jaunpur Sultanate War. The Sultan of Bengal also acknowledged the nominal authority of the Abbasid caliph in Cairo. Portuguese India was the first European state entity to establish relations with the Bengal Sultanate. The Bengal Sultan permitted the opening of the Portuguese settlement in Chittagong.

Conquests and vassal states
Soon after its creation, the Bengal Sultanate sent the first Muslim army into Nepal. Its forces reached as far as Varanasi while pursuing a retreating Delhi Sultan.

Arakan was the most volatile neighbor of the Bengal Sultanate. In 1428, the forces of Bengal restored Min Saw Mun as the king of Arakan after he fled to the court of Jalaluddin Muhammad Shah. According to traditional Arakanese history, Arakan became a tributary state of Bengal and its kings adopted Muslim titles to fashion themselves after Bengali Sultans. Arakan later shrugged off Bengali hegemony and restored full independence. It later invaded southeastern Bengal several times, sometimes with success and sometimes unsuccessfully. Arakan continued to mint its coins following the model of Bengali tanka for 300 years, even after the dissolution of the Bengal Sultanate. A total of 16 Arakanese kings used Muslim titles. Arakan forcefully deported thousands of Bengali Muslims and Hindus during its invasions and collusion with the Portuguese. Deportees included the poet Alaol. As a result, the Bengali minority in Arakan developed a distinct Arakanese identity and became influential elites in Arakanese society. Arakanese Muslims, known today as Rohingya people, trace their ancestry to the period of Bengali influence in Arakan.
     
The Bengal Sultanate also counted Tripura as a vassal state. Bengal restored the throne of Tripura by helping Ratna Manikya I to assume the throne. The Bengal Sultanate controlled Odisha at various points since the reign of Ilyas Shah. During the reign of Alauddin Hussain Shah, Bengal became an expanding regional empire. Under Hussain Shah, Bengali territory covered Arakan, Assam, Tripura, Orissa, Bihar and Jaunpur. Hussain Shah minted coins with the proclamation "conqueror of Kamrupa, Kamata, Jajnagar and Orissa". The Pratapgarh Kingdom came under Bengali suzerainty. The island of Chandradwip was annexed by the Hussain Shahi dynasty. In 1498, the Hussain Shahi dynasty dispatched military general Shah Ismail Ghazi with an army of 24,000 soldiers and a naval flotilla to conquer Assam. The Bengal forces overthrew the Khen dynasty. Prince Daniyal, a son of the Sultan, was appointed governor of Assam. Bengali control of Assam extended into the Brahmaputra Valley and up to Hajo. Assamese Muslims can trace their history to the Bengal Sultanate's conquest.

Maritime trade

Bengali ships dominated the Bay of Bengal and were the largest ships in the Indian and Pacific oceans. A royal vessel from Bengal could accommodate three tribute missions- from Bengal, Brunei and Sumatra- and was evidently the only vessel capable of such a task. European travelers like Ludovico di Varthema, Duarte Barbosa and Tomé Pires wrote about the presence of a large number of wealthy Bengali merchants and shipowners in Malacca. The trade between Bengal and the Maldives, based on rice and cowry shells, was probably done on Arab-style baghlah ships.

The Chinese Muslim envoy Ma Huan wrote about a flourishing shipbuilding industry and Bengal's significant seaborne trade. The muslin trade in Bengal, the production of silk and the development of several other crafts were indicated in Ma Huan's list of items exported from Bengal to China. Bengali shipping co-existed with Chinese shipping until the latter withdrew from the Indian Ocean in the mid-15th-century. Bengali port cities like Chittagong and Satgaon were possibly entrepots for importing and re-exporting goods to China.

Mughal period
The Mughal Empire eventually controlled the region under its Bengal Subah viceregal province. The Mughal Emperors considered Bengal their most prized province. Emperor Akbar redeveloped the Bengali calendar. In the 16th-century, many Ulama of the Bengali Muslim intelligentsia migrated to other parts of the subcontinent as teachers and instructors of Islamic knowledge such as Ali Sher Bengali to Ahmedabad, Usman Bengali to Sambhal and Yusuf Bengali to Burhanpur.

The process of Islamization of eastern Bengal, now Bangladesh, is not fully understood due to limited documentation from the 1200s to 1600s, the period during which Islamization is believed to have occurred. There are numerous theories about how Islam spread in region; however, the overwhelming evidence is strongly suggestive of a gradual transition of the local population from Buddhism, Hinduism and other indigenous religions to Islam starting in the thirteenth century facilitated by Sufi missionaries (such as Shah Jalal in Sylhet for example) and later by Mughal agricultural reforms centered around Sufi missions 
   
The factors facilitating conversion to Islam from Buddhism, Hinduism and indigenous religions, again is not fully understood. Lack of primary sources from that era have resulted in various hypotheses. Generally modern prevailing hypotheses about the early stages of Islamification of East Bengal focus on Sufi missionaries capitalizing on disaffected Buddhists and other indigenous groups following the initial conquest of the area by the Brahmin and Kshatriya dominated Sena Empire followed a few decades later by the arrival of Bakhtiyar Khalji of the Delhi Sultanate in the early 1200s and the later agrarian reforms of the Mughal Empire in the 1500s.

Centuries prior to the advent of Islam into the region, Bengal was a major center of Buddhism on the Indian Subcontinent.  The area was under the rule of the Buddhist Pala Empire for several centuries until its collapse and subsequent conquest by the Hindu Sena Empire in the 1170s.  This was an era of significant Buddhist-Brahmin religious conflict as they represented diametrically opposite camps in the Dharmic tradition with the Buddhist focus on equality threatening the Brahmin caste-based power structure. In the preceding centuries Buddhism underwent a slow decline as Hindu kingdom gradually enveloped Buddhists states in the area and began of process of "de-Buddification" manifested by the reframing of Buddhist figures as Hindu avatars and the reincorporation of resistant Buddhist subjects into lower castes in society. As the Pala Empire's base of power was in Northern and Eastern Bengal, it is likely that these were areas with large Buddhist majorities which were likely heavily subjugated the Sena Empire. A few decades following the Sena Conquest of the region, the Sena, themselves, were conquered by Bakhtiyar Khalji opening up the region to a greater influx of Sufi missionaries. This hypothesis would explain why the Islam spread faster in East Bengal than West Bengal. Essentially, East Bengal had a large Buddhist population compared to West Bengal. The conquest of the area by Hindu kingdoms lead to the subjugation of Buddhists in the region. With the Turkic conquest, came the arrival of Sufi missionaries who were more successful at converting the largely disaffected Buddhist East Bengal versus the largely Hindu regions of West Bengal.

A few centuries later the agrarian reforms of the Mughal Empire accelerated conversion and population growth across Bangladesh by creating a system of farming villages centered around Sufi missions. The Mughals granted landless peasants land around these missions in order to accelerate development of the fertile Ganges plain. The lead to greater concentrations of people in the area with more opportunities for Sufi missionaries to preach Islam.  According to historian Richard M. Eaton, Islam became the religion of the plough in the Bengal delta. Islam's emergence in the region was intimately tied with agriculture. The delta was the most fertile region in the empire. Mughal development projects cleared forests and established thousands of Sufi-led villages, which became industrious farming and craftsmanship communities. The projects were most evident in the Bhati region of East Bengal, the most fertile part of the delta.

This made East Bengal a thriving melting pot with strong trade and cultural networks. It was the most prosperous part of the subcontinent. East Bengal became the center of the Muslim population in the eastern subcontinent and corresponds to modern-day Bangladesh.

Ancestry
According to the 1881 Census of Bengal, Muslims constituted a bare majority of the population of Bengal proper (50.2 percent compared with the Hindus at 48.5 percent). However, in the eastern part of Bengal, Muslims were thick on the ground. The proportions of Muslims in Rajshahi, Dhaka and Chittagong divisions were 63.2, 63.6 and 67.9 percent respectively. The debate draws on the writings of some late nineteenth-century authors, but in its current form was initially formulated in 1963 by M.A. Rahim. Rahim suggested that a significant proportion of Bengal's Muslims were not Hindu converts but were descendants of 'aristocratic' immigrants from various parts of the Muslim world. Specifically, he estimated that in 1770, of about 10.6 million Muslims in Bengal, 3.3 million (about 30 percent) had 'foreign blood'. In the late 1980s Richard Eaton, in a book and a series of papers, raised awkward questions about the social liberation theory of conversion from Hinduism to Islam that have yet to be fully addressed, further endorsing Rahim's argument. In the late 19th century, when the first census was  conducted on Bengal region in the year of (1872), it was found that the number of Hindus are at (18m) and Muslims at (17.5m) were almost the same. According to the 1872 Census, only 1.52% or say 2.66 lakhs of the Bengali Muslim population claimed foreign ancestry.

Jalaluddin Muhammad Shah was born as Jadu, the son of Hindu King Raja Ganesha. He later ruled most of Bengal as a converted Muslim. Jalaluddin played a major role in converting the Hindus of Bengal to Islam. He maintained good rapport with Non-Muslims in his kingdom. According to an interpretation of a Sanskrit sloka by D. C. Bhattacharya, Jalaluddin appointed Rajyadhar, a Hindu, as the commander of his army. He gained support of Muslim scholars – Ulama and the Shaikhs. He reconstructed and repaired the mosques and other religious architectures destroyed by Raja Ganesha.

British colonial period

The Bengal region was annexed by the East India Company (EIC) in 1757. In the following decades, Bengalis led numerous revolts against Company rule. In the early 19th century, Titumir led a peasant uprising against the East India Company. Meanwhile, the Bengali Muslim Haji Shariatullah led the Faraizi movement, which advocated Islamic revivalism. The Faraizis sought to create a caliphate and cleanse the region's Muslim society of what they deemed "un-Islamic practices". They were successful in galvanising the Bengali peasantry against the EIC. However, the movement experienced a crackdown after the suppression of the Indian Rebellion of 1857 and lost impetus after the death of Haji Shariatullah's son Dudu Miyan.

After 1870, Muslims began a seeking British-style education in increasingly larger numbers. Under the leadership of Sir Syed Ahmed Khan the promotion the English language among Muslims of India also influenced Bengali Muslim society. Social and cultural leaders among Bengali Muslims during this period included Munshi Mohammad Meherullah, who countered Christian missionaries, writers Ismail Hossain Siraji and Mir Mosharraf Hossain; and feminists Nawab Faizunnesa and Roquia Sakhawat Hussain.

Eastern Bengal and Assam (1905-1912)
A precursor to the modern state of Bangladesh was the province of Eastern Bengal and Assam in British India. The province was created on 16 October 1905 by the Viceroy of India Lord Curzon. The province covered present-day Bangladesh, northeastern India and a part of West Bengal. It had a Bengali Muslim majority. Dacca, the former Mughal capital of Bengal, was declared by the British as the capital of Eastern Bengal and Assam. The province was established through the first partition of Bengal. The British government cited administrative reasons for the creation of the new province. It promised increased investment in education and the economy of the new province. The partition galvanized Muslim nationalism in South Asia and led to the formation of the All India Muslim League in Dacca in 1906. It also stoked anti-Muslim sentiment and anti-British sentiment among Hindus. Growing opposition from the Indian National Congress, which accused the British of a divide and rule policy, caused the British government to reconsider the new provincial geography. During the Delhi Durbar in 1911, King George V announced that provinces would once again be reorganized. The first partition of Bengal was annulled; while Calcutta lost its status as the imperial capital of India. The imperial capital was shifted to New Delhi; while Calcutta became the capital of a reunited, albeit smaller, Bengal province. Assam was made a separate province. Orissa and Bihar were also separated from Bengal. As a compensation for Dacca, the British government established a university for the city in 1921.

During the short lifespan of the province, school enrollment increased by 20%. New subjects were introduced into the college curriculum, including Persian, Sanskrit, mathematics, history and algebra. All towns became connected by an inter-district road network. The population of the capital city Dacca rose by 21% between 1906 and 1911.

1947 Partition and Bangladesh

An important moment in the history of Bengali self-determination was the Lahore Resolution in 1940, which was promoted by politician A. K. Fazlul Huq. The resolution initially called for the creation of a sovereign state in the "Eastern Zone" of British India. However, its text was later changed by the top leadership of the Muslim League. The Prime Minister of Bengal Huseyn Shaheed Suhrawardy proposed an independent, undivided, sovereign "Free State of Bengal" in 1947. Despite calls from liberal Bengali Muslim League leaders for an independent United Bengal, the British government moved forward with the Partition of Bengal in 1947. The Radcliffe Line made East Bengal a part of the Dominion of Pakistan. It was later renamed as East Pakistan, with Dhaka as its capital.

The East Pakistan Awami Muslim League was formed in Dhaka in 1949. The organisation's name was later secularised as the Awami League in 1955. The party was supported by the Bengali bourgeoisie, agriculturalists, the middle class, and the intelligentsia.

Sir Khawaja Nazimuddin, Mohammad Ali of Bogra, and H. S. Suhrawardy, all of whom were Bengali Muslims, each served as Pakistan's prime minister during the 1950s; however, all three were deposed by the military-industrial complex in West Pakistan. The Bengali Language Movement in 1952 received strong support from Islamic groups, including the Tamaddun Majlish. Bengali nationalism increased in East Pakistan during the 1960s, particularly with the Six point movement for autonomy. The rise of pro-democracy and pro-independence movements in East Pakistan, with Sheikh Mujibur Rahman as the principal leader, led to the Bangladesh Liberation War in 1971.

Bangladesh was founded as a secular Muslim majority nation. In 1977, however, President Ziaur Rahman, trying to consolidate his power under martial law, removed secularism from the constitution and replaced it with "a commitment to the values of Islam." In 2010, the Bangladesh Supreme Court reaffirmed secular principles in the constitution.

Science and technology

Historical Islamic kingdoms that existed in Bengal employed several clever technologies in numerous areas such as architecture, agriculture, civil engineering, water management, etc. The creation of canals and reservoirs was a common practice for the sultanate. New methods of irrigation were pioneered by the Sufis. Bengali mosque architecture featured terracotta, stone, wood and bamboo, with curved roofs, corner towers and multiple domes. During the Bengal Sultanate, a distinct regional style flourished which featured no minarets, but had richly designed mihrabs and minbars as niches.

Islamic Bengal had a long history of textile weaving, including export of muslin during the 17th and 18th centuries. Today, the weaving of Jamdani is classified by UNESCO as an intangible cultural heritage.

Modern science was begun in Bengal during the period of British colonial rule. Railways were introduced in 1862, making Bengal one of the earliest regions in the world to have a rail network. For the general population, opportunities for formal science education remained limited. The colonial government and the Bengali elite established several institutes for science education. The Nawabs of Dhaka established Ahsanullah School of Engineering which later became the Bangladesh University of Engineering and Technology.

In the second half of the 20th century, the Bengali Muslim American Fazlur Rahman Khan became one of the most important structural engineers in the world, helping design the world's tallest buildings. Another Bengali Muslim German-American, Jawed Karim, was the co-founder of YouTube.

In 2016, the modernist Bait-ur-Rouf Mosque, inspired by the Bengal Sultanate-style of buildings, won the Aga Khan Award for Architecture.

Demographics

Bengali Muslims constitute the world's second-largest Muslim ethnicity (after the Arab world) and the largest Muslim community in South Asia. An estimated 152million Bengali Muslims live in Bangladesh as of 2021, where Islam is the state religion and commands the demographic majority. The Indian state of West Bengal is home to an estimated 23-24 million Bengali Muslims as per 2021 estimation, rest 6-7 million Muslims are Urdu and Surjapuri speaking Muslims. Two districts in West BengalMurshidabad and Maldah have a Muslim majority and North Dinajpur has a plurality. The Indian state of Assam has over 9million Bengali Muslims out of 13 million Muslim population in Assam. Nine out of thirty-three districts in Assam have a Muslim majority. Tripura, a North Eastern state of India has around 3.8 lakh Bengali Muslim population, or say 9%  as of 2021. The Rohingya community in western Myanmar have significant Bengali Muslim heritage.

A large Bengali Muslim diaspora is found in the Arab states of the Persian Gulf, which are home to several million expatriate workers from South Asia. A more well-established diaspora also resides in the United States, Canada, the United Kingdom, and Pakistan. The first Bengali Muslim settlers in the United States were ship jumpers who settled in Harlem, New York and Baltimore, Maryland in the 1920s and 1930s.

Culture

Surnames

Surnames in Bengali Muslim society reflect the region's cosmopolitan history. They are mainly of Arabic and Persian origin, with a minority of  Bengali surnames.

Art
Sheikh Zainuddin was a prominent Bengali Muslim artist in the 18th century during the colonial period. His works were inspired by the style of Mughal courts.

Architecture
An indigenous style of Islamic architecture flourished in Bengal during the medieval Sultanate period. Terracotta and stone mosques with multiple domes proliferated in the region. Bengali Muslim architecture emerged as a synthesis of Bengali, Persian, Byzantine, and Mughal elements.

The Indo-Saracenic style influenced Islamic architecture in South Asia during the British Raj. A notable example of this period is Curzon Hall. Modern and contemporary Islamic architecture evolved in the region since the 1950s.

Sufism

Sufi spiritual traditions are central to the Bengali Muslim way of life. The most common Sufi ritual is the Dhikr, the practice of repeating the names of God after prayers. Sufi teachings regard the Prophet Muhammad as the primary perfect man who exemplifies the morality of God. Sufism is regarded as the individual internalisation and intensification of the Islamic faith and practice. The Sufis played a vital role in developing Bengali Muslim society during the medieval period. Historic Sufi missionaries are regarded as saints, including Shah Jalal, Khan Jahan Ali, Shah Amanat, Shah Makhdum Rupos and Khwaja Enayetpuri. Their mausoleums are focal points for charity, religious congregations, and festivities.

Syncretism
As part of the conversion process, a syncretic version of mystical Sufi Islam was historically prevalent in medieval and early modern Bengal. The Islamic concept of tawhid was diluted into the veneration of Hindu folk deities, who were now regarded as pirs.  Folk deities such as Shitala (goddess of smallpox) and Oladevi (goddess of cholera) were worshipped as pirs among certain sections of Muslim society.

Language

Bengali Muslims maintain their indigenous language and script. This tradition is similar to that of Central Asian and Chinese Muslims.

Bengali evolved as the most easterly branch of the Indo-European languages. The Bengal Sultanate promoted the literary development of Bengali over Sanskrit, apparently to solidify their political legitimacy among the local populace. Bengali was the primary vernacular language of the Sultanate. Bengali borrowed a considerable amount of vocabulary from Arabic and Persian. Under the Mughal Empire, considerable autonomy was enjoyed in the Bengali literary sphere. The Bengali Language Movement of 1952 was a key part of East Pakistan's nationalist movement. It is commemorated annually by UNESCO as International Mother Language Day on 21 February.

Literature

While proto-Bengali emerged during the pre-Islamic period, the Bengali literary tradition crystallised during the Islamic period. As Persian and Arabic were prestige languages, they significantly influenced vernacular Bengali literature. The first efforts to popularise Bengali among Muslim writers was by the Sufi poet Nur Qutb Alam. The poet established the Rikhta tradition which saw poems written in half Persian and half colloquial Bengali. The invocation tradition saw Bengali Muslim poets re-adapting Indian epics by replacing invocations of Hindu gods and goddesses with figures of Islam. The romantic tradition was pioneered by Shah Muhammad Sagir, whose work on Yusuf and Zulaikha was widely popular among the people of Bengal. Other notable romantic works included Layla Madjunn by Bahram Khan and Hanifa Kayrapari by Sabirid Khan. The Dobhashi tradition features the use of Arabic and Persian vocabulary in Bengali texts to illustrate Muslim contexts. Medieval Bengali Muslim writers produced epic poetry and elegies, such as Rasul Vijay of Shah Barid, Nabibangsha of Syed Sultan, Janganama of Abdul Hakim and Maktul Hussain of Mohammad Khan. Cosmology was a popular subject among Sufi writers. In the 17th century, Bengali Muslim writers such as such as Alaol found refuge in Arakan where he produced his epic, Padmavati.

Bengal was also a major center of Persian literature. Several newspapers and thousands of books, documents and manuscripts were published in Persian for 600 years. The Persian poet Hafez dedicated an ode to the literature of Bengal while corresponding with Sultan Ghiyasuddin Azam Shah.

The first Bengali Muslim novelist was Mir Mosharraf Hossain in the 19th century. The highly acclaimed poetry of Kazi Nazrul Islam espoused spiritual rebellion against fascism and oppression. Nazrul also wrote Bengali ghazals. Begum Rokeya was a pioneering Bengali female writer who published Sultana's Dream, one of the earliest examples of feminist science fiction. The Muslim Literary Society of Bengal was founded by free-thinking and progressive teachers of Dacca University under the chairmanship of Dr.Muhammad Shahidullah on 19 January 1926. The Freedom of Intellect Movement was championed by the society. When Bengal was partitioned in 1947, a distinct literary culture evolved in East Pakistan and modern Bangladesh. Shamsur Rahman was regarded as the country's poet laureate. Jasimuddin became noted for poems and songs reflecting life in rural Bengal. Al Mahmud was considered one of the greatest Bengali poets to have emerged in the 20th century. Humayun Ahmed promoted the Bangladeshi field of magical realism. Akhtaruzzaman Elias was noted for his works set in Old Dhaka. Tahmima Anam has been a noted writer of Bangladeshi English literature.

Literary societies
 Kendriyo Muslim Sahitya Sangsad
 Muslim Sahitya-Samaj
 Bangiya Mussalman Sahitya Samiti
 Bangiya Sahitya Bisayini Mussalman Samiti
 Mohammedan Literary Society
 Purba Pakistan Sahitya Sangsad
 Pakistan Sahitya Sangsad, 1952
 Uttar Banga Sahitya Sammilani
 Rangapur Sahitya Parisad

Literary magazines 
 Begum
 Mussalman Sahitya Patrika
 Saogat

Music

A notable feature of Bengali Muslim music is the syncretic Baul tradition. The leading iconic practitioner of Baul tradition was Fakir Lalon Shah. Baul music is included in the UNESCO Masterpieces of the Oral and Intangible Heritage of Humanity.

Nazrul Sangeet is the collection of 4,000 songs and ghazals written by Kazi Nazrul Islam.

South Asian classical music is widely prevalent in the region. Alauddin Khan, Ali Akbar Khan, and Gul Mohammad Khan were notable Bengali Muslim exponents of classical music.

In the field of modern music Runa Laila became widely acclaimed for her musical talents across South Asia.

Cuisine

Dhaka, the capital of Mughal Bengal and present day capital of Bangladesh, has been the epitome of Perso-Bengali and Arab-Bengali cuisines, a contrast to Calcutta, the former capital of the British India and capital of present-day West Bengal, which was the central point of Anglo-Indian cuisine. Within Bengali cuisine, Muslim dishes include the serving of meat curries, pulao rice, various biryani preparations, and dry and dairy-based desserts alongside traditional fish and vegetables. Bakarkhani breads from Dhaka were once immensely popular in the imperial court of the Mughal Empire. Other major breads consumed today include naan and paratha.  In present-day Bangladesh the Mughal-influenced foods are immensely popular such as Shuti Kabab, Kalo Bhuna, Korma, Rôst, Mughlai Porota, Jali Kabab, Shami Kabab, Akhni, Tehari, Tanduri Chicken, Kofta, Phirni and Shingara.
Different types of Bengali biryani include the Kachi (mutton), Illish pulao (hilsa), Tehari (beef), and Murg Pulao (chicken). Mezban is a renowned spicy beef curry from Chittagong. Halwa, pithas, yogurt, and shemai are typical Muslim desserts in Bengali cuisine.

Festivals
Eid-ul-Fitr at the end of Ramadan is the largest religious festival of Bengali Muslims. The festival of sacrifice takes place during Eid-al-Adha, with cows and goats as the main sacrificial animals. Muharram and the Prophet's Birthday are national holidays in Bangladesh. Other festivals like Shab-e-Barat feature prayers and exchange of desserts.

Bishwa Ijtema
The Bishwa Ijtema, organised annually in Bangladesh, is the second-largest Islamic congregation after the Hajj. It was founded by the orthodox Sunni Tablighi Jamaat movement in 1954.

Leadership

There is no single governing body for the Bengali Muslim community, nor a single authority with responsibility for religious doctrine. However, the semi-autonomous Islamic Foundation, a government institution, plays an important role in Islamic affairs in Bangladesh, including setting festival dates and matters related to zakat. The general Bengali Muslim clergy remains deeply orthodox and conservative. Members of the clergy include Mawlānās, Imams, Ulamas, and Muftis.

The clergy of the Bengali Muslim Shia minority have been based in the old quarter of Dhaka since the 18th century.

Notable individuals

Muhammad Yunus is the first Bengali Muslim Nobel laureate who was awarded the Nobel Peace Prize for founding the Grameen Bank and pioneering the concepts of microcredit and microfinance.  Begum Rokeya was one of the world's first Muslim feminists. Kazi Nazrul Islam was renowned as the Rebel Poet of British India and the National Poet of Bangladesh. Sheikh Mujibur Rahman was the first President of Bangladesh. Iskander Mirza was the first president of the Islamic Republic of Pakistan. Khwaja Salimullah was one of the founders of the All-India Muslim League. Rushanara Ali was the amongst the first Muslim MPs in the House of Commons of the United Kingdom. Fazlur Rahman Khan was a prominent American Bengali Muslim engineer who brought in spectacular changes in  design of modern skyscraper construction. Jawed Karim is one of the co-founders of YouTube. Sal Khan is a co-founder of Khan Academy. Humayun Rashid Choudhury served as President of the United Nations General Assembly. M. A. G. Osmani was a four star general who founded the Bangladesh Armed Forces. Altamas Kabir was the Chief Justice of India. Nafisa Ali are prominent Bengali Muslims who act in Indian cinema. Alaol was a medieval Bengali Muslim poet who worked in the royal court of Arakan. Mohammad Ali Bogra served as the Prime Minister of Pakistan. Begum Sufia Kamal was a leading Bengali Muslim feminist, poet, and civil society leader. Zainul Abedin was the pioneer of modern Bangladeshi art. Muzharul Islam was the grand master of South Asian modernist terracotta architecture.

See also
Islam in South Asia
Other Bengali religious groups
 Bengali Hindus
 Bengali Buddhists
 Bengali Christians

Other Muslim ethnic groups
 Arab Muslims
 Punjabi Muslims
 Uyghur Muslims
 Kurdish Muslims

Outlines
 Outline of Bangladesh
 Outline of Islam

References

Bibliography
 
 
 
 
 
 
 
 

 

Muslims by ethnicity
Islam in Bangladesh
Islam in India by location
Ethnic groups in India
Ethnic groups in Bangladesh
Bangladeshi diaspora
Bengali diaspora
Muhajir communities